Claudia Dell (born Claudia Dell Smith; January 10, 1910 – September 5, 1977) was an American showgirl and actress of the stage and movies.

Early years 
Dell was born in San Antonio, Texas on January 10, 1910. She attended school in San Antonio and Mexico. Dell was blonde and blue-eyed, with a porcelain face. Her height was 5'5". In Bette Davis's 1962 autobiography The Lonely Life, she makes a passing reference to "Little Claudia Dell", an actress from the 1930s and early 1940s, "whose image," Bette remarks, "was used as Columbia Pictures' signature for years."

Early career
Dell's aunt Mary Dell was an actress in vaudeville. Claudia's first experience as an entertainer was playing her violin for soldiers at Kelly Field during World War I.

After completing her education at home, Dell went to New York City and became an understudy to Irene Delroy in the Ziegfeld Follies of 1927. She studied acting in New York City at the Academy and singing at the Juilliard School. Soon she was sent to London to play the lead in the musical comedy Mary Mary. The play's run lasted one year. While in England, scouts from Warner Brothers asked her to come to Hollywood. She returned to New York City with her aunt following a tour of southern Europe. Claudia became homesick, rejected leads offered her in two stage productions, and moved to Los Angeles, where her family lived.

Hollywood
Dell was given a contract by Warner Bros. to star in a number of musical pictures. She played the title role in the lavish musical film Sweet Kitty Bellairs (1930). Her next role was with Al Jolson in Big Boy (1930). In 1930, the public had grown weary of musicals. Warner Brothers, however, had begun to film two other musicals (released in 1931) in which Dell was given a leading role. The first of these was another lavish  production titled Fifty Million Frenchmen. In the second film, Sit Tight (1931), she played the love interest of Paul Gregory. Ironically, both pictures had their musical sequences cut before release. Warner Bros. dropped her option in 1931 (along with most of its other musical stars), and Claudia (having become associated with musicals) was relegated to Poverty Row productions.

B-movies
Dell bounced back at Universal Pictures in Destry Rides Again (1932), which starred cowboy actor Tom Mix. In 1935, she played the heroine in the serial The Lost City. Other 1930s films in which she appeared included Algiers (1938) and We're in the Legion Now! (1936). By the close of the 1930s, she was reduced to playing minor roles, and the 1940s continued her career decline. She was cast in low-budget productions like Black Magic (1944), a Charlie Chan series movie. Also in 1944, she was in "Meeting at Midnight", another Charlie Chan movie. She had a part in Call of the Jungle (1944), a jungle adventure from Monogram Pictures that showcased stripper Ann Corio.

Radio 
After her film career faltered, Dell was under contract for five years with RKO and did many Lux Radio Theater programs for Cecil B. DeMille and Orson Welles. She had her own television show in New York, titled Leave It to the Girls.

In the early 1970s, Dell had a syndicated radio program that aired in the Midwest titled The Claudia Dell Show. She wrote a syndicated column for eight years, and in 1973, completed a collaboration with English author Helga Moray. This was for a television script considered for the Theater of the Week program.

Personal life 
Dell and Phillip G. Offin married when she was 17. She obtained a divorce from him two years later in 1930. On December 29, 1934, Dell married theatrical agent Edward Silton. She gave her age as 22. They later divorced. She married retired chewing gum manufacturer Daniel Emmett in 1947.

Modeling instructor
She worked as a receptionist in a beauty shop in Hollywood and made appearances in early television dramas. In 1973, she became the student director of the John Robert Powers School of Charm and Modeling in Sherman Oaks, California and Woodland Hills Promenade. Previously, she worked for 12 years as director of the John Robert Powers School in Beverly Hills, California. Dell said "There is no better work than being able to be associated with a school which helps mold young people for the future and one that gives a whole new dimension to a woman's life."

Death 
Dell died in Los Angeles in 1977. Her remains are interred at Valhalla Memorial Park Cemetery in North Hollywood.

Partial filmography

 Montana Moon (1930) - Froggy's Blonde Girlfriend (uncredited)
 Big Boy (1930) - Annabel
 50 Million Frenchmen (1931) - Lu Lu Carroll
 Bachelor Apartment (1931) - Lita Andrews
 Confessions of a Co-Ed (1931) - Peggy
 Left Over Ladies (1931) - Patricia
 Scandal for Sale (1932) - Dorothy Pepper
 Destry Rides Again (1932) - Sally Dangerfield
 The Midnight Lady (1932) - Jean Austin
 Hearts of Humanity (1932) - Ruth Sneider
 Midnight Warning (1932) - Enid Van Buren
 The Woman Who Dared (1933) - Mickey Martin - Factory Owner
 Cleopatra (1934) - Octavia
 Trails End (1935) - Mrs. Janet Moorehead
 Midnight Phantom (1935) - Diana Sullivan
 Speed Limited (1935) - Marjorie
 The Lost City (1935, Serial) - Natcha Manyus (archive footage)
 Ghost Patrol (1936) - Natalie Brent
 Yellow Cargo (1936) - Fay Temple
 What Becomes of the Children? (1936) - Gayle Adams
 We're in the Legion Now! (1936) - Yvonne Cartier
 Boots of Destiny (1937) - Alice Wilson
 A Bride for Henry (1937) - Helen Van Orden
 Algiers (1938) - Marie
 Angels with Dirty Faces (1938)
 Juarez and Maximilian (1939) - Agnes Salm (uncredited)
 The Mad Empress (1939) - Agnes Salm (uncredited)
 Sauce for the Gander (1940) - Mrs. Rogers
 Spotlight Serenade (1943) - Betty
 Call of the Jungle (1944) - Gracie
 Black Magic (1944) - Vera Starkey

References

Bibliography
Port Arthur, Texas News, Texas Girl Is Latest Find, Sunday, September 21, 1930, Page Nine.
Port Arthur News, Claudia Dell Weds Theatrical Agent, Sunday, December 30, 1934, Page 2.
Van Nuys, California The News, Today's Personality Is...Claudia Dell, Thursday, November 15, 1973. Page 5-C.

External links

Claudia Dell at Glamour Girls of the Silver Screen
Claudia Dell New York Public Library Digital Gallery photo

1910 births
1977 deaths
American musical theatre actresses
American stage actresses
American female dancers
Dancers from Texas
Actresses from San Antonio
American film actresses
20th-century American actresses
20th-century American singers
20th-century American women singers
20th-century American dancers
Burials at Valhalla Memorial Park Cemetery